Idgah may also refer to a place for public prayers during the Islamic festivals of Eid.

Idgah is towards the south-west of Agra City. Idgah has evolved into an important township where many important offices are located in the precincts of Idgah Colony. The place is an important commercial area in Agra. Idgah has a Bus Stand, which is the Bus Stand in Agra and also a Railway Station, which make Idgah critical for Transportation needs of Agra. Agra Airport in Kheria is also to Idgah.

Important offices
Idgah is also important administratively and below is list of some of the Important offices located here.
Foreigner's Registration Office
Director of Telegraphs
PWD Inspection House
Food Corporation of India
Tourist Information Centre

Neighbourhoods in Agra